Dehi may refer to:
 Dehi, Mazandaran, Iran
 Dehi, Iraq